Vladimir Vladimirovich Kiselev (October 4, 1936 – August 14, 1999) was an ice hockey player and an ice hockey coach. He is the "Master of Sport of USSR" and honored coach of Russian Federation. He awarded the Medal "For Labour Valour".

Career
Vladimir Kiselev started his career as a bandy player in 1948 at the "Dynamo Chelyabinsk". In 1953, he switched to ice hockey. He is one of the most successful wingers in Soviet hockey history. He played 323 matches and scored 199 goals (1954—1957 "Burevestnik Chelyabinsk" - 28 matches, 21 goals,  1957—1958 "Traktor Chelyabinsk" - 32 matches, 17 goals, 1958—1962 "CSKA Moscow" - 110 matches, 84 goals, 1962—1967 "Dynamo Moscow" - 153 matches, 67 goals).

Coaching career
1967-1970 Dizel Penza - player-coach
1971-1973 Torpedo Ust-Kamenogorsk - head coach
1974-1981 Dynamo Moscow - assistant coach
1981-1983 Dynamo Moscow - head coach
1985 USSR Youth National Team - head coach

References

1936 births
1999 deaths
Honoured Masters of Sport of the USSR
Traktor Chelyabinsk players
Soviet ice hockey forwards